William Eisenberg (born September 5, 1937) is an American bridge and backgammon professional. In bridge, Eisenberg has won five Bermuda Bowl world team titles and he won the backgammon world title in 1975. Eisenberg is World Bridge Federation (WBF) and American Contract Bridge League (ACBL) Grand Life Master. He lived in Boca Raton, Florida, as of 1994 and 1998.

Eisenberg was from New York City in 1968, when the Dallas businessman Ira Corn hired him as an original member of the first full-time professional bridge team, the Dallas Aces. He left the team and moved from Texas to California in 1971.

Bridge accomplishments

Honors

 ACBL Hall of Fame, 1998

Wins
 Bermuda Bowl (5) 1970, 1971, 1976, 1977, 1979
 North American Bridge Championships (14)
 Vanderbilt (2) 1971, 1978
 Spingold (2) 1969, 1973
 Reisinger (2) 1970, 1976
 Grand National Teams (2) 1974, 1976
 Men's Board-a-Match Teams (1) 1968
 North American Swiss Teams (1) 2001
 Senior Knockout Teams (3) 1995, 1996, 1999
 Life Master Pairs (1) 1968
 United States Bridge Championships (7)
 Open Team Trials (5) 1969, 1974, 1975, 1977, 1979 (Jan)
 Senior Team Trials (2) 2005, 2008
 Other notable wins:
 Cap Gemini Pandata World Top Invitational Pairs (1) 1991
 Maccabiah Games (1) 1981

Runners-up
 Bermuda Bowl (1) 1975
 World Senior Teams (1) 1994
 North American Bridge Championships (15)
 Vanderbilt (6) 1966, 1970, 1973, 1976, 1983, 1989
 Spingold (2) 1970, 1999
 Reisinger (3) 1968, 1981, 1983
 Men's Board-a-Match Teams (1) 1969
 Jacoby Open Swiss Teams (1) 1993
 Senior Knockout Teams (1) 2001
 Men's Pairs (1) 1981
 United States Bridge Championships (3)
 Open Team Trials (1) 1973
 Open Pair Trials (1) 1968
 Senior Team Trials (1) 2001
 Other notable 2nd places:
 Cavendish Invitational Teams (1) 1985
 Cavendish Invitational Pairs (1) 1976

Bibliography
 Kent Goulding, Backgammon with the Champions (Kensington, MD: KG Publications), volume 1, 1981 ; volume 2, 1982 
Each volume covers Eisenberg in at least one match. "Series of annotated matches between good players. ... Commentary by Goulding, often in collaboration with Kit Woolsey." In particular, volume 1, number 1 was originally published as a booklet: "Paul Magriel vs. Billy Eisenberg: American Open Backgammon Championship, Las Vegas, Nevada, November 1979. Round 4, 15-point match (iv+42 pages)."

References

External links
  – with video interviews
 

1937 births
American contract bridge players
Bermuda Bowl players
American backgammon players
Sportspeople from New York City
People from Boca Raton, Florida
Living people